Mohamed Ould Khalifa (born 6 May 1968) is a Mauritanian long-distance runner.

Khalifa competed for Mauritania in two Summer Olympics, firstly at the 1988 Summer Olympics, where he competed in the 5000 metres and finished 17th in his heat, but didn't qualify for the next round. Four years later at the 1992 Summer Olympics he entered the marathon but he didn't finish the course.

References

1968 births
Living people
Mauritanian male long-distance runners
Mauritanian male marathon runners
Olympic athletes of Mauritania
Athletes (track and field) at the 1988 Summer Olympics
Athletes (track and field) at the 1992 Summer Olympics